Synchronistic Wanderings is a compilation album by American rock singer Pat Benatar. Spanning three discs, it is a box set chronicling her career from 1979 to 1999—twenty years. Included are soundtrack contributions, b-sides, studio outtakes, previously unreleased songs, and rarities, as well as well-known singles—overall, it adds up to fifty-three tracks total. The accompanying booklet chronicles her career, discussing her ups and downs and giving additional commentary and background on most of the included songs from Benatar and husband Neil Giraldo.

Among the previously unreleased tracks are a cover of Roy Orbison's "Crying", a demo of "Love Is a Battlefield", a live version of "I Need a Lover", part 1 of "Rise" (from her 1993 album Gravity's Rainbow), a live performance of "Run Between the Raindrops" (from Seven the Hard Way), and a remix of "Every Time I Fall Back" (also from Gravity's Rainbow).

Track listing

Personnel 

 Evren Göknar - Mastering Engineer
 David Tedds - Catalog Producer

References

External links 
 [ Pat Benatar on Billboard.com]
 Official Site

1999 compilation albums
Pat Benatar albums
Chrysalis Records compilation albums